John Tesseyman Woods (4 September 1907 – 7 April 1965), also known by the nickname of "Tank", was an English professional rugby league footballer who played in the 1930s.

Playing career

International honours
Woods won caps for England while playing at Barrow in 1930 against Other Nationalities, in 1930 against Wales, in 1933 against Other Nationalities, and won a cap for Great Britain while playing at Barrow in 1933 against Australia.

Club career
Woods made his début for Warrington on 3 February 1934, and he played his last match for Warrington on 31 August 1935.

Career records
Jack 'Tank' Woods is sixth in Barrow's all time try scorers list with 139-tries.

References

External links

1907 births
1965 deaths
Barrow Raiders players
England national rugby league team players
English rugby league players
Great Britain national rugby league team players
Liverpool City (rugby league) players
Rugby league players from Lancashire
Rugby league wingers
Warrington Wolves players